Sachiko Murata (村田幸子, born 1943) is Japanese scholar of comparative philosophy and mysticism and a professor of religion and Asian studies at Stony Brook University. She is a 2011 Guggenheim Fellow.

Life
Born in Asahikawa, Hokkaidu, Japan in 1943, Murata received her B.A. in family law from Chiba University in Japan. She worked at a law firm in Tokyo for a year, and later attended Iran's University of Tehran, where she was the first woman and first non-Muslim to study fiqh (Islamic jurisprudence).  She received her PhD in Persian literature in 1971, and then moved to the faculty of theology. She received her MA in Islamic jurisprudence in 1975, but shortly before completing her PhD in fiqh, the Iranian Revolution caused her and her husband William Chittick to leave the country.

Murata resettled at SUNY Stony Brook in Stony Brook, New York, where she teaches Islam, Confucianism, Taoism, and Buddhism.

Works

Translated

References

External links
 "The Tao of Islam", sufi.ru, Sachiko Murata]
 "The Unity of Being in Liu Chih's "Islamic Neoconfucianism"", Sachiko Murata

Humanities academics
1943 births
Living people
Chiba University alumni
University of Tehran alumni
Stony Brook University faculty
Japanese women academics
Women scholars of Islam